Ridge Manor is a census-designated place (CDP) in Hernando County, Florida, United States. The population was 4,513 at the 2010 census.

Geography
Ridge Manor is located in eastern Hernando County at  (28.499108, -82.181305). It is bordered to the south by Lacoochee in Pasco County. The north-flowing Withlacoochee River winds through the southern and western parts of Ridge Manor.

U.S. Route 301 runs through the east side of Ridge Manor, leading north  to Bushnell and south  to Dade City. U.S. Route 98 crosses the western side of Ridge Manor, leading west  to Brooksville, the Hernando County seat, and south 10 miles to Dade City. Florida State Road 50 runs across the northern part of Ridge Manor, connecting US 98 and 301. SR 50 leads east  to Mascotte and west with US 98 to Brooksville. A portion of Ridge Manor along US 98 / SR 50 in the vicinity the Withlacoochee State Trail (originally the South Florida Railroad Pemberton Ferry Branch) was the location of the ghost town of Rital.

Ridge Manor Community Park, located off Ridge Manor Boulevard, has baseball fields used for Little League.

Demographics

As of the census of 2000, there were 4,108 people, 1,712 households, and 1,225 families residing in the CDP. The racial makeup of the CDP was 95.52% White, 1.85% African American, 0.49% Native American, 0.29% Asian, 1.07% from other races, and 0.78% from two or more races. Hispanic or Latino of any race were 2.87% of the population.

There were 1,712 households, out of which 24.2% had children under the age of 18 living with them, 59.5% were married couples living together, 7.7% had a female householder with no husband present, and 28.4% were non-families. 22.5% of all households were made up of individuals, and 11.6% had someone living alone who was 65 years of age or older.  The average household size was 2.40 and the average family size was 2.79.

In the CDP, the population was spread out, with 21.4% under the age of 18, 5.6% from 18 to 24, 23.6% from 25 to 44, 25.9% from 45 to 64, and 23.6% who were 65 years of age or older.  The median age was 45 years. For every 100 females, there were 96.9 males.  For every 100 females age 18 and over, there were 93.1 males.

The median income for a household in the CDP was $30,875, and the median income for a family was $33,724. Males had a median income of $30,421 versus $24,492 for females. The per capita income for the CDP was $18,722.  About 9.9% of families and 15.1% of the population were below the poverty line, including 29.0% of those under age 18 and 6.5% of those age 65 or over.

See also

 List of census-designated places in Florida
 Hernando County Library

References

External links

Census-designated places in Hernando County, Florida
Census-designated places in Florida